Khede or Mauje Khede (literally meaning "village") is a small village in Niphad Taluka of Nashik district in Maharashtra State of India.
Located on the left bank of Vinata River, Khede is also known for temple of Shri Hinglaj Mata.

Location
Khede is located 18 km from National Highway 3.

Demographics
As of 2001 census, Khede had a population of 5,807 with 2,869 males and 2,838 females. Males constitute 51% of the population and females 49%. Khede has an average literacy rate of 76.01%, higher than the national average of 59.5%. Male Literacy is 86.09%, and female literacy is 5.79%. In Khede, 12% of the population is under 6 years of age. Khede has an average birth rate of 18.84% and an average death rate of 6.02%.

There are total of 977 households in the village and the village border area is spread in the area of 2,384 hectares.

Economy
Khede has a farming economy, traditional crops include millet, chili pepper, cotton, bhuimug, harbhara, jowar, onion, sugarcane and wheat. Farmers rely on rain water as well as water from rivers for farming needs.

Khede farming economy is included in the states income and expenditure accounts. As for budget year 2007-2008 Khede village had accounted for an income of Rs. 1,356,897.50 whereas the total expenditure was Rs. 1,335,400.00.

Administration
Khede has as Village Gram Panchayat for day-to-day administration. The District Zilla Panchayat headquarters is at Dhule and the Block Panchayat is also at Dhule.

Khede has no commercial banks, co-operative banks, agricultural credit societies, non-agricultural credit societies or other credit societies present within the village.

Commercial facilities
Khede has numerous drinking water facilities which are mainly available through a common tap or a common well. There are 3 wells, 2 hand pumps, 2 electric pumps and 5 common taps available within the village as drinking water sources.

Education facilities
Khede has one primary school, one secondary school and one higher secondary school within the village. For all higher education, village students have to go to the bigger cities close by. There are also another 2 government funded childcare and mother-care centers (Anganwadi) within the village as part of the Integrated Child Development Services program started by the Indian government to combat child hunger and malnutrition in 1975.

Medical facilities
Khede has 4 private clinics and 2 medical shops present within the village. But it lacks a larger government hospital.

Communication facilities
Khede has its own post office but there are no telegraph or telephone facilities within the village.

Recreation and cultural facilities
Khede has no recreational facilities such as cinemas or video halls present within the village.

Khede has no cultural facilities such as sports-clubs, stadium or auditorium present within the village.

Transport 

Khede has no railway station of its own, the closest railway station is Dhule which is 15 km from the village.

Khede is connected by the State Transport Buses that ply between Dhule, Kusumba and Malegaon.

Khede has no airport of its own, the closest airport is at Dhule.

See also 
 Dhule District
 List of districts of Maharashtra
 Maharashtra

References 

 1. Census Of India: 2001: Population for Village Code 00155100
 2. Government of India: Ministry of Panchayati Raj

Villages in Dhule taluka
Villages in Dhule district